Mielkesia is a genus of moths in the family Saturniidae first described by Claude Lemaire in 1988.

Species
Mielkesia paranaensis (Régo Barros & Mielke, 1968)

References

Ceratocampinae